Rok Tršan (born August 29, 1992 in Logatec, Slovenia) is a Slovenian biathlete.

Tršan began to compete in biathlon in 2014.

Biathlon results
All results are sourced from the International Biathlon Union.

World Championships
0 medals

*During Olympic seasons competitions are only held for those events not included in the Olympic program.
**The single mixed relay was added as an event in 2019.

References

External links

 

1992 births
Living people
Slovenian male biathletes
People from Logatec
Slovenian male cross-country skiers
Biathletes at the 2022 Winter Olympics
Olympic biathletes of Slovenia
21st-century Slovenian people